The United States Naval Test Pilot School (USNTPS), located at Naval Air Station (NAS) Patuxent River in Patuxent River, Maryland, provides instruction to experienced United States Navy, Marine Corps, Army, Air Force, and foreign military experimental test pilots, flight test engineers, and flight test flight officers in the processes and techniques of aircraft and systems testing and evaluation.

History
The school was established in 1945, when the Navy's Flight Test Group transferred from Naval Air Station Anacostia, Washington, DC to Naval Air Station Patuxent River and Test Pilot Training Division or TPT was established.

USNTPS is the primary test pilot school for U.S. Army aviators, as it is the only U.S. military test pilot school to offer instruction on rotary-wing aircraft. They also operate an exchange program with the U.S. Air Force Test Pilot School located at Edwards Air Force Base.  Class 1 graduated December 21, 1948. In 1957 the school's name was officially changed to the United States Naval Test Pilot School.

Milestones:
 Rotary Wing Syllabus introduced in 1961
 11 month syllabus established in 1973
 Airborne Systems Syllabus introduced in 1975
 Short Course Department organised in 1997

Training 
The selection process is highly competitive, and applicants are chosen by a selection board. The curriculum accommodates three main specialities with two classes annually (11 months in duration):
 fixed wing (pilot/engineer)
 rotary wing (pilot/engineer)
 airborne systems (Naval flight officer/engineer)

Training program includes:
 pre-arrival flight training in T-6 (NAS Pensacola), T-38C (Randolph AFB), H-72, and H-60 (Western Army Aviation Training Site (WAATS), Marana, AZ)
 530 academic hours
 100 sorties/120 flight hours
 about 25 technical reports

Instructional flow is traditional theory to practice: classroom, lab and simulation, exercise briefing and flight demonstration, later data flights with technical reports preparation, review/debrief/critique. 

Aircraft used by the United States Naval Test Pilot School include the T-6B Texan II, T-38C Talon, UH-72A Lakota, EH-60A QuickFix II, C-26A ASTARS III, F/A-18F Super Hornet, C-12C Huron, NU-1B Otter, OH-58C Kiowa, U-6A Beaver, and the X-26A Frigate. The USNTPS also temporarily operates a TB-25N Mitchell "Panchito", a CT-133 Silver Star of Ace Maker Aviation, a Cessna A185F Skywagon floatplane, AH-1F Huey Cobra of Army Aviation Heritage Foundation and a Learjet 25 of the Calspan Corporation, all used briefly at different times by the school.

Notable alumni 
Those include (by year/class of graduation):
 Edward "Whitey" Feightner (1949, Class 2)
 George Chamberlain Duncan (1949, Class 3)
 Alan Shepard (1951, Class 5)
 John Glenn (1954, Class 12)
 Thomas B. Hayward (1954, Class 12)
 James Bond Stockdale (1954, Class 12)
 Scott Carpenter (1954, Class 13)
 Richard Gordon (Class 19)
 Jim Lovell (1958, Class 20)
 Wally Schirra (1958, Class 20) 
 Pete Conrad (1958, Class 20)
 John Young (1959, Class 23)
 Alan Bean (Class 26)
 Richard G. Thomas (Class 31) 
 Frederick Gregory (Class 58)
 Charles Bolden (former NASA Administrator and former Space Shuttle Commander) (Class 75)
 Pierre Thuot (Class 83)
 William "Willie" McCool (Class 101)
 Mark Kelly (Class 105)
 Scott Kelly (Class 105) 
 Sunita Williams (1993, Class 104)
 Stephen S. Oswald (Class 74)
 Paul Sohl (Class 104) 
 Art "Turbo" Tomassetti (1997, Class 112)
 Anne McClain (Class 143)

See also

List of test pilot schools

References

External links 
 USNTPS Website

Educational institutions established in 1945
Naval aviation education
Test pilot schools
United States naval aviation
United States Navy schools and training
 
1945 establishments in Washington, D.C.